The Palace of the Revolution, is a palace in Havana, Cuba within the Plaza de la Revolución that serves as the house of the Cuban government and the First Secretary of the Cuban Communist Party.

History 
The order to build the palace was given by then-President Carlos Prío Socarrás in 1943. It was to be the seat of the Supreme Court and the Attorney General. It was designed by the architect Pérez Benoita in 1943, with construction ending over a decade later in 1957. Between 1964 and 1965, transformations were made in the building to adapt it to the current Palace of the Revolution.

In 1965, the revolutionary government led by Fidel Castro ordered the relocation of the seat of government to the palace.

Functions 

The building is divided into three areas, with the first being the office of the Council of Ministers. The second are the headquarters of the Council of State and the offices of the President and the First Vice President. The last is the offices of the Central Committee of the Communist Party of Cuba.

Halls 
 Hall of Ferns - It is named for the large number of fern plants surrounding it. It is here where the President of Cuba receives international leaders who visit the nation.
 Presidential Office - The office of the President
 Theater Hall 
 Government Hospital.

References 

Buildings and structures in Havana
Government buildings completed in 1957
Presidential residences
20th-century architecture in Cuba